Albert "Tommy" Wilansky (13 September 1921, St Johns, Newfoundland – 3 July 2017, Bethlehem, Pennsylvania) was a Canadian-American mathematician, known for introducing Smith numbers.

Biography
Wilansky was educated as an undergraduate at Dalhousie University, where he received an M.A. in mathematics in 1944. From 1944 to 1947 he was a graduate student at Brown University. In 1947 he received his Ph.D. with advisor Clarence Raymond Adams and dissertation An application of Banach linear functionals to the theory of summability.

From 1948 until his official retirement in 1992, Wilansky was a faculty member of the mathematics department of Lehigh University.

Wilansky did research in analysis, specializing in summability theory, linear topological spaces, Banach algebras, and functional analysis. He was the author of several books and the author or co-author of more than 80 articles. He lectured at over 50 different universities. In 1969 he received the Mathematical Association of America's Lester R. Ford Award for his 1968 article Spectral Decomposition of Matrices for High School Students. (The 1969 award was also given individually to 5 other mathematicians.)

Wilansky was married to his first wife from 1947 until her death in 1969. They had two daughters. He had three step-daughters from his second marriage.

Selected publications

Articles

Books

References

1921 births
2017 deaths
20th-century American mathematicians
21st-century American mathematicians
Functional analysts
Mathematical analysts
Dalhousie University alumni
Brown University alumni
Lehigh University faculty
Canadian emigrants to the United States